Laura Cerero Gabriel is a Mexican Paralympic powerlifter who competes in international elite events. She is a triple Paralympic bronze medalist, double Parapan American Games silver medalist and has won four medals at the World Para Powerlifting Championships.

References

Living people
People from Oaxaca City
Paralympic powerlifters of Mexico
Powerlifters at the 2000 Summer Paralympics
Powerlifters at the 2004 Summer Paralympics
Powerlifters at the 2008 Summer Paralympics
Powerlifters at the 2012 Summer Paralympics
Powerlifters at the 2016 Summer Paralympics
Medalists at the 2000 Summer Paralympics
Medalists at the 2004 Summer Paralympics
Medalists at the 2008 Summer Paralympics
Medalists at the 2003 Parapan American Games
Medalists at the 2007 Parapan American Games
Medalists at the 2011 Parapan American Games
Medalists at the 2015 Parapan American Games
Date of birth missing (living people)
Year of birth missing (living people)